John Smith was Leader of the Labour Party and Leader of the Official Opposition from 18 July 1992 until his death on 12 May 1994. Smith became leader upon succeeding Neil Kinnock, who had resigned following the 1992 general election in which the Conservative Party had defeated Labour for the fourth successive time.

Prior to being Leader of the Opposition, Smith had been a member of the Government of James Callaghan as President of the Board of Trade (1978–1979), and served under his predecessor Neil Kinnock's Shadow Cabinet as Shadow Chancellor of the Exchequer (1987–1992).

Smith's tenure as Leader of the Opposition saw the Government's policies of the implementation of the Citizen's Charter, progress in the Northern Ireland peace negotiations, and the creation and centralisation of the European Union. Smith died suddenly on 12 May 1994, and was replaced as Acting Leader by Margaret Beckett, who served until 21 July 1994.

Shadow Cabinet list

Initial Shadow Cabinet
On 24 July 1992, John Smith announced the following Shadow Cabinet:
 John Smith – Leader of Her Majesty's Most Loyal Opposition and Leader of the Labour Party
 Margaret Beckett – Deputy Leader of Her Majesty's Most Loyal Opposition, Deputy Leader of the Labour Party, Shadow Leader of the House of Commons, and Elections Co-ordinator
 Gordon Brown – Shadow Chancellor of the Exchequer.
 Jack Cunningham – Shadow Foreign Secretary
 Tony Blair – Shadow Home Secretary
 David Clark – Shadow Secretary of State for Defence
 Ann Taylor – Shadow Secretary of State for Education
 Frank Dobson – Shadow Secretary of State for Employment
 Jack Straw – Shadow Minister for Local Government and Housing
 Chris Smith – Shadow Secretary of State for the Environment and Shadow Minister for London
 David Blunkett – Shadow Secretary of State for Health
 Donald Dewar – Shadow Secretary of State for Social Security
 Bryan Gould – Shadow Secretary of State for National Heritage
 Robin Cook – Shadow Secretary of State for Trade and Industry
 John Prescott – Shadow Secretary of State for Transport
 Tom Clarke – Shadow Secretary of State for Scotland
 Ann Clwyd – Shadow Secretary of State for Wales
 Kevin McNamara – Shadow Secretary of State for Northern Ireland
 Michael Meacher – Shadow Minister for Overseas Development
 Mo Mowlam – Shadow Chancellor of the Duchy of Lancaster, Shadow Minister for the Citizen's Charter, and Shadow Minister for the Status of Women
 Harriet Harman – Shadow Chief Secretary to the Treasury
 Ron Davies – Shadow Minister of Agriculture, Fisheries and Food
 Lord Richard – Leader of the Opposition in the House of Lords
 Derek Foster – Labour Chief Whip in the House of Commons
 Lord Graham of Edmonton – Labour Chief Whip in the House of Lords
  Lord Irvine of Lairg – Shadow Lord Chancellor

Changes
 29 September 1992: Gould resigned over the Party's stance on the Maastricht Treaty. and was replaced as Shadow National Heritage Secretary by Ann Clwyd, who retained her position as Shadow Welsh Secretary.

1993 reshuffle
Smith reshuffled the Shadow Cabinet on 21 October 1993, following the 1993 Shadow Cabinet elections. Clwyd left the Shadow Cabinet. Mowlam replaced her as Shadow National Heritage Secretary, with Clare Short (who also lost in the Shadow Cabinet elections) replacing her as Shadow Minister for the Status of Women. Meacher replaced Mowlam as Shadow Chancellor of the Duchy of Lancaster and Shadow Minister for the Citizen's Charter. He was in turn replaced by Clarke at the Overseas Development portfolio, and Clarke was replaced as Scottish Spokesperson by new Shadow Cabinet minister George Robertson. Clwyd was replaced as Shadow Welsh Secretary by Davies, who was replaced at Agriculture by Gavin Strang. Prescott and Dobson exchanged portfolios (receiving Employment and Transport, respectively), with Dobson also taking London from Chris Smith. Blunkett became Chair of the Labour Party while retaining the Health portfolio.

 John Smith – Leader of Her Majesty's Most Loyal Opposition and Leader of the Labour Party
 Margaret Beckett – Deputy Leader of Her Majesty's Most Loyal Opposition, Deputy Leader of the Labour Party, Shadow Leader of the House of Commons, and Elections Co-ordinator
 Gordon Brown – Shadow Chancellor of the Exchequer
 Jack Cunningham – Shadow Foreign Secretary
 Tony Blair – Shadow Home Secretary
 David Clark – Shadow Secretary of State for Defence
 Ann Taylor – Shadow Secretary of State for Education
 Frank Dobson – Shadow Secretary of State for Transport and Shadow Minister for London
 Jack Straw – Shadow Minister for Local Government and Housing
 Chris Smith – Shadow Secretary of State for the Environment
 David Blunkett – Shadow Secretary of State for Health and Chair of the Labour Party
 Donald Dewar – Shadow Secretary of State for Social Security
 Mo Mowlam – Shadow Secretary of State for National Heritage
 Robin Cook – Shadow Secretary of State for Trade and Industry
 John Prescott – Shadow Secretary of State for Employment
 George Robertson – Shadow Secretary of State for Scotland
 Ron Davies – Shadow Secretary of State for Wales
 Kevin McNamara – Shadow Secretary of State for Northern Ireland
 Tom Clarke – Shadow Minister for Overseas Development
 Michael Meacher – Shadow Chancellor of the Duchy of Lancaster and Shadow Minister for the Citizen's Charter
 Clare Short – Shadow Minister for the Status of Women
 Harriet Harman – Shadow Chief Secretary to the Treasury
 Gavin Strang – Shadow Minister of Agriculture, Fisheries and Food
 Lord Richard – Leader of the Opposition in the House of Lords
 Derek Foster – Labour Chief Whip in the House of Commons
 Lord Graham of Edmonton – Labour Chief Whip in the House of Lords
  Lord Irvine of Lairg – Shadow Lord Chancellor

See also
 1992 Labour Party leadership election
 1992 Labour Party Shadow Cabinet election
 1993 Labour Party  Shadow Cabinet election

References

Official Opposition (United Kingdom)
Smith
1992 establishments in the United Kingdom
1993 in the United Kingdom
1994 in the United Kingdom
1992 elections in the United Kingdom
1994 disestablishments in the United Kingdom
British shadow cabinets
John Smith (Labour Party leader)